Wiesenttal is a municipality in the district of Forchheim in Bavaria in Germany.

Municipal subdivisions 
Wiesenttal is divided into 21 parishes:

 Albertshof
 Birkenreuth
 Draisendorf
 Engelhardsberg
 Gößmannsberg
 Haag
 Kuchenmühle
 Muggendorf
 Neudorf
 Niederfellendorf
 Oberfellendorf
 Rauhenberg
 Schottersmühle
 Störnhof
 Streitberg
 Trainmeusel
 Voigendorf
 Wartleiten
 Wohlmannsgesees
 Wöhr
 Wüstenstein

References

 
Forchheim (district)